The Masdar Institute of Science and Technology was a graduate level, research-oriented university focused on alternative energies, sustainability, and environmental research. In 2017, it merged with two other institutions in Abu Dhabi, Petroleum Institute and Khalifa University, to become the multi-campus and sole-branded Khalifa University, and its previous structure is now known as the "Masdar City campus". This Khalifa University campus is still in Masdar City in Abu Dhabi, United Arab Emirates.

Masdar Institute was an integral part of the non-profit side of the Masdar Initiative and was the first institution to occupy Masdar City. The Technology and Development Program at the Massachusetts Institute of Technology provided scholarly assessment and advice to Masdar Institute. , the collaborative agreement between the two institutions is still in place and currently hosts several exchange students from the legacy cohorts.

History 
Masdar Institute was established on February 25, 2007. , the institute employed 85 faculty members and had an enrollment of 456 students. The establishment of Masdar Institute was part of a resource diversification policy for the Emirate of Abu Dhabi. Abu Dhabi's leadership views research and education in alternative energy as a keystone for the future development of the emirate and expressed their commitment through the establishment of Masdar Initiative, Masdar City and the Zayed Future Energy Prize.

The institute's interim provost, Behjat Al Yousuf, was appointed in May 2015. She previously served as the dean of students at Masdar. In 2017, it merged with two other institutions in Abu Dhabi, Petroleum Institute and Khalifa University, to become the multi-campus and sole-branded Khalifa University.

Campus 
The campus, like Masdar City, was designed by architectural firm Foster + Partners and the first phase of the project was managed by CH2M Hill.

Research centers 
 TwinLab3 Dimensional StackedChips Research Center
 Sustainable Bio-energy Research Center (SBRC)
 Smart Grid and Smart Building Center of Excellence
 Renewable Energy Resource Mapping and Assessment Center

Students 
By 2017, 456 students were enrolled and the institute had more than 550 alumni.

Faculty and research 
Masdar Institute commenced teaching in September 2009. Its academics conducted research individually and in collaboration with several top ranked universities, notably MIT, on topics including water environment and health, advanced energy systems and microsystems, and advanced materials. By 2018, through the MI-MIT collaboration, 8 projects were completed and 11 one-to-one research and 3 flagship projects (larger research teams) were being executed. The collaboration had a scientific outreach that included 201 scientific peer reviewed journal and book publications and 217 conference papers and presentations by April 2018.

References

External links 

 
 Masdar Initiative website

Educational institutions established in 2007
Technical universities and colleges in the United Arab Emirates
Engineering universities and colleges
Universities and colleges in the Emirate of Abu Dhabi
Education in Abu Dhabi
Buildings and structures in Abu Dhabi
Massachusetts Institute of Technology
2007 establishments in the United Arab Emirates